The Ministry of Civil Aviation and Tourism is a ministry of the government of the People's Republic of Bangladesh responsible for the formulation of national policies and programmes for development and regulation of civil aviation and the regulation of the Bangladeshi tourism industry and the promotion of the Bangladesh as a tourist destination.

Departments
Bangladesh Parjatan Corporation (Tourism Corporation)
Bangladesh Tourism Board
Biman Bangladesh Airlines
Civil Aviation Authority, Bangladesh

See also
List of World Heritage Sites in Bangladesh
List of beaches in Bangladesh
List of hotels in Bangladesh

References

External links
 

 
Bangladesh
Civil aviation in Bangladesh
Civil Aviation and Tourism
Tourism in Bangladesh
Bangladesh